Fort Frederick State Park is a public recreation and historic preservation area on the Potomac River surrounding the restored Fort Frederick, a fortification active in the French and Indian War (1754–1763) and the American Revolutionary War (1775-1783). The state park lies south of the town of Big Pool, Maryland. The Chesapeake and Ohio Canal runs through the park grounds. The site was designated a National Historic Landmark in 1973.

History

French and Indian War
Fort Frederick was built in 1756-57 by the colony of Maryland. During the French and Indian War in 1756, a £6000 appropriation was authorized by the Maryland Legislature at the request of Governor Horatio Sharpe to build a fortification on the frontier. The fort, named after Frederick Calvert, 6th Baron Baltimore, was completed the following year. The design of the fort conforms to the style developed early in the 18th century by Sebastien de Vauban, a French military engineer who is considered the father of modern fortification.

The large stone fort was designed primarily as a place of refuge for area settlers. Between 1757 and 1758, small raids by Native people in nearby settlements caused settlers in the surrounding countryside to flee eastward.  At the same time men of the 60th Regiment of Foot and local militia soldiers garrisoned the fort.  Ranging parties were sent from the fort to patrol the area and to deter if not prevent raids by Native Americans.

The fort was not designed to resist artillery, as it was correctly assumed that the French would not be able to transport artillery to the remote location from the west.  The fort served its purpose in 1763 during Pontiac's Rebellion; however, the fort was never directly attacked.

American Revolutionary War
The fort was used as a prisoner of war camp from 1777 to 1783. As many as 1,000 captured British and German soldiers were incarcerated there after the Battles of Saratoga (1777) and Yorktown (1781).

American Civil War
Fort Frederick was sold at auction in 1791 and lay abandoned until the American Civil War. The fort was garrisoned at the outbreak of war and was used as a gun emplacement to protect the Chesapeake and Ohio Canal and the Baltimore and Ohio Railroad, which paralleled the canal. The 1st Maryland Infantry (US) occupied the area in December 1861 and Company H fought in a skirmish at the fort against Confederate raiders on Christmas Day, 1861.  The regiment left in February 1862.  In October 1862, a picket from the 12th Illinois Cavalry briefly occupied the area. The military usefulness of the fort ended by 1862.

20th Century
In 1922, the property was acquired by the State of Maryland for use as Maryland's first state park. Archaeological investigations and the discovery of the original plans allowed a complete reconstruction. Much of the restoration work of the 1930s was done by the Civilian Conservation Corps.

Description
The fort is a large stone quadrangle with bastions at each corner. The main gate is located in the center of the south curtain wall. Two of the three barracks buildings have been restored. The west barrack is reconstructed to its 1758 appearance, while the east barrack contains displays regarding the history of the fort. The north barrack, known as the Governor's House, has not been reconstructed.

Activities and amenities
In addition to tours, displays, and exhibits at the fort, the park also offers a campground, fishing in Big Pool Lake, picnicking facilities, and a nature trail. The  Western Maryland Rail Trail begins immediately to the west of the park.

See also
List of National Historic Landmarks in Maryland
National Register of Historic Places listings in Washington County, Maryland

References

External links

Fort Frederick State Park Maryland Department of Natural Resources
Fort Frederick State Park Map Maryland Department of Natural Resources
Friends of Fort Frederick State Park The Friends of Fort Frederick 

State parks of Maryland
State parks of the Appalachians
Frederick
National Historic Landmarks in Maryland
Military and war museums in Maryland
Museums in Washington County, Maryland
Civilian Conservation Corps in Maryland
Protected areas established in 1922
British-American culture in Maryland
Frederick
Frederick
Parks in Washington County, Maryland
Civilian Conservation Corps museums
1922 establishments in Maryland
Historic American Buildings Survey in Maryland
Frederick
National Register of Historic Places in Washington County, Maryland
American Revolution on the National Register of Historic Places
American Civil War on the National Register of Historic Places